The Liga das Escolas de Samba do Rio de Janeiro (LIERJ; English: League of Samba Schools of the Rio de Janeiro) is the leading association that organizes the Série A Group in the Carnival in Rio de Janeiro.

On 15 July 2008, seven presidents of associations of Grupo de acesso decided to found in LESGA in order to join project and what they thought was best for the access group A, on August 7, 2008 with the entry of three associations, and associations founded by 10

From there, they separated from the AESCRJ and created their own association, the LESGA, which will manage the parades, handing over the proceeds to the samba school of the Grupo de acesso A.

After separation of the Association, which was defined by the regulation, would rise 1 of the Grupo Rio de Janeiro 1 and going down 1, but the AESCRJ not agree because the dissidents who founded the LESGA had approved two going down and up two of the RJ-1, which caused a rift between the LESGA and AESCRJ, but this increased even when there came no school for the RJ-1 and Cubango and Padre Miguel finished tied calculation, which would generate more problems.

In an agreement signed with RIOTUR and the AESCRJ was determined that 2010 will be 12 schools that parade, and the two fall to the Grupo Rio de Janeiro 1 (old Grupo de acesso B), and being promoted to Group A access The same regulation will serve to Carnival 2011. from 2012, the school champion of the Rio de Janeiro 1 LESGA be affiliated with, and the parade is lowered, returning to join the AESCRJ, beyond the school champion who belongs to LIESA, and of course lowered to become a member of LESGA. because of problems in determining the most LESGA not organized the parade. taking March 2012. been determined that the election victory of Déo Pessoa in front of the entity. months later they changed the name to LIERJ.

Missing some months for the carnival, various samba schools migrated to LIERJ, with the approval of the government. all this after internal problems in AESCRJ that led to subsidization. Thus Group B was restored, but today is handled by the LIESB. While the last placed school for the year in the final scores is placed under the LIESB's B Series (Silver Division 1), the A Series (Gold Division) champion advances as a full member of LIESA, the carnival organizer, and its attached Special Group.

Presidents

Série Ouro 
 Em Cima da Hora
 Acadêmicos do Cubango
 Unidos da Ponte
 Unidos do Porto da Pedra
 União da Ilha do Governador
 Unidos de Bangu
 Acadêmicos do Sossego
 Lins Imperial
 Inocentes de Belford Roxo
 Estácio de Sá
 Acadêmicos de Santa Cruz
 Unidos de Padre Miguel
 Acadêmicos de Vigário Geral
 Império da Tijuca
 Império Serrano

Second Division Champions 
 1952 - Unidos do Indaiá (1) 
 1953 - Acadêmicos do Engenho da Rainha (1) 
 1954 - Beija-Flor (1) 
 1955 - União de Jacarepaguá (1) 
 1955 - Paz e Amor (1) 
 1956 - Lins Imperial  (1) 
 1956 - União do Centenário (1) 
 1957 - Unidos de Bangu (1) 
 1958 - Mocidade Independente de Padre Miguel (1) 
 1959 - Unidos de Padre Miguel (1) 
 1960 - Caprichosos de Pilares (1) 
 1961 - Unidos do Cabuçu (1) 
 1962 - Unidos de Bangu (2) 
 1963 - Unidos da Capela (1) 
 1964 - Império da Tijuca (1) 
 1965 - Acadêmicos de Santa Cruz (1) 
 1966 - São Clemente (1) 
 1967 - Estácio de Sá (1) 
 1968 - Em Cima da Hora (1) 
 1969 - Acadêmicos de Santa Cruz (2) 
 1970 - Império da Tijuca (2) 
 1971 - Em Cima da Hora (2) 
 1972 - Tupy de Brás de Pina (1) 
 1973 - Estácio de Sá (2)
 1974 - União da Ilha do Governador (1) 
 1975 - Lins Imperial (2) 
 1976 - Império da Tijuca (3) 
 1977 - Arrastão de Cascadura (1) 
 1978  - Estácio de Sá (3) 
 1979 - Unidos de Vila Isabel (1) 
 1980 - Unidos da Tijuca (1) 
 1981 - Estácio de Sá (4) 
 1982 - Caprichosos de Pilares (2) 
 1983 - Estácio de Sá (5) 
 1984 - Unidos do Cabuçu (2) 
 1985 - Unidos da Ponte  (1) 
 1986 - Unidos do Jacarezinho (1) 
 1987 - Unidos da Tijuca (2) 
 1988 - Arranco (1) 
 1989 - Acadêmicos de Santa Cruz (3) 
 1990 - Unidos do Viradouro (1) 
 1991 - Tradição (1) 
 1992 - Acadêmicos do Grande Rio (1) 
 1993 - Tradição (2) 
 1994 - Unidos da Villa Rica (1) 
 1995 - Unidos do Porto da Pedra (1) 
 1996 - Acadêmicos de Santa Cruz (4) 
 1997 - Tradição (3) 
 1998 - Império Serrano (1) 
 1999 - Unidos da Tijuca (3) 
 2000 - Império Serrano  (2) 
 2001 - Unidos do Porto da Pedra  (2) 
 2002 - Acadêmicos de Santa Cruz (5) 
 2003 - São Clemente (2) 
 2004 - Unidos de Vila Isabel (2) 
 2005 - Acadêmicos da Rocinha (1) 
 2006 - Estácio de Sá (6) 
 2007 - São Clemente (3) 
 2008 - Império Serrano (3) 
 2009 - União da Ilha do Governador (2) 
 2010 - São Clemente (4)  
 2011 - Renascer de Jacarepaguá (1) 
 2012 - Inocentes de Belford Roxo (1) 
 2013 - Império da Tijuca (4) 
 2014 - Unidos do Viradouro (2) 
 2015 - Estácio de Sá (7) 
 2016 - Paraíso do Tuiuti (1) 
 2017 - Império Serrano (4) 
 2018 - Unidos do Viradouro (3) 
 2019 - Estácio de Sá (8)
 2020 - Imperatriz Leopoldinense (1)

References 

Rio Carnival